The 172nd Pennsylvania House of Representatives District is located in Montgomery County and Philadelphia County and includes the following areas:

 Montgomery County
 Rockledge
 Philadelphia (PART)
 Ward 41 [PART, Divisions 19, 23 and 24]
 Ward 54 [PART, Divisions 10, 14, 15, 19, 20, 21 and 22]
 Ward 55 [PART, Divisions 09, 10, 13, 14, 15, 16 and 17]
 Ward 56 [PART, Divisions 01, 03, 04, 08, 09, 13, 14, 15, 32, 33, 34 and 40]
 Ward 57 [PART, Divisions 13 and 14]
 Ward 58 [PART, Divisions 09, 10, 13, 16, 17, 19 and 26]
 Ward 63 [PART, Divisions 01, 02, 03, 04, 05, 06, 07, 08, 09, 10, 11, 12, 13, 14, 15, 22, 23 and 25]
 Ward 64 [PART, Divisions 01, 03, 05, 07, 08, 09 and 15]

Representatives

References

Government of Montgomery County, Pennsylvania
Government of Philadelphia
172